The Cumbria Institute of the Arts was a further and higher education institution in Carlisle, Cumbria, England.

History

Founded as the Society for the Encouragement of Fine Arts in 1822, it proceeded as the Carlisle College of Art, from 1950, and switched to Cumbria Institute of the Arts from Cumbria College of Art and Design in 2001.

The Institute merged with St Martin's College (founded in Lancaster) to form the University of Cumbria on 1 August 2007. Cumbria Institute became the University's Faculty of Arts.

Notable alumni

 Conrad Atkinson, artist
Rikki Chamberlain, actor (Captain Mack)
 Michael Cumming, director
 Bryan Dick, actor (The Long Firm, Blackpool, Blood and Chocolate)
 Richard Dyer, co-founder of Skiddle Ltd
 Sheila Fell,  landscape painter
 Margaret Harrison, artist
 Leo Horsfield, actor (I Love Luci, Outpost Rise of the Spetsnaz,)
 Charlie Hunnam, actor (Sons of Anarchy, Byker Grove, Queer as Folk)
Percy Kelly, artist
 Helen Skelton, TV presenter (Blue Peter)
 Keith Tyson, 2002 Turner Prize winner
Lorna Graves, painter, sculptor

References

Art schools in England
Education in Cumbria
Carlisle, Cumbria
Further education colleges in Cumbria
Educational institutions established in 1822
Educational institutions disestablished in 2007
University of Cumbria
Defunct universities and colleges in England
1822 establishments in England